Jincy Rose Dunne (born May 15, 1997) is a women's ice hockey player for Ohio State and a member of the United States women's national ice hockey team. She represented the USA at the 2022 Winter Olympics.

Playing career

US U18 Women's National Team 
Jincy Dunne was a member of the United States U-18 Women's Team and has played in three international IIHF U-18 Women's World Championships. At the 2013 edition of the IIHF U18 Women's Worlds, Jincy led the team with a plus 11 rating and was named one of Team USA'S three best players selected by team coaches. She collected the silver medal after losing to Team Canada in the final. She was also the youngest player on Team USA. As a member of the United States Under-18 National Women's Team, she was the only player from the state of Missouri to be on the roster for the 2014 IIHF U18 Women's World Championships. She was named team captain and best defensemen by the Directorate at the 2014 edition of the tournament. Dunne was also named one of Team USA's best players. Before the 2015 IIHF U18 Women's World Championship, she was once again named team captain. Of note, she would score twice in the gold medal game on January 12 at the 2015 IIHF U18 Women's World Championships in Buffalo, New York, earning Top Defender honors. She would also log the game-winning tally in the shootout against Canada on January 5. On January 15, 2015, Dunne dropped the puck at the ceremonial faceoff between the St. Louis Blues and the Detroit Red Wings.

US Women's National Team
She made her debut with the United States National Women's Team at the 2012 4 Nations Cup. Her first game occurred on November 6, 2012, against Sweden. Of note, she would participate in three games as the United States claimed the gold medal. Dunne was also a member of the 2013 4 Nations Cup team but did not play in the tournament. She almost made the United States Olympic team for the 2014 Sochi Games. Jincy was a member of the 25-player roster but was cut after the roster had to be trimmed down to 21. Dunne would have been the youngest female hockey player to skate in the Winter Games for Team USA.

On January 2, 2022, Dunne was named to Team USA's roster to represent the United States at the 2022 Winter Olympics.

NCAA
Dunne plays for the Ohio State Buckeyes women's ice hockey program. Dunne was regarded as the top recruit in the women's hockey world.

Awards and honors
Directorate Award, Best Defenseman, 2014 IIHF World Women's U18 Championship Source: 
Directorate Award, Best Defenseman, 2015 IIHF World Women's U18 Championship Source: IIHF.com
Media All Star-Team, 2015 IIHF World Women's U18 ChampionshipSource: IIHF.com
WCHA Rookie of the Month, January 2017
2019–2020 Ohio State female athlete of the year
2019-20 CCM Hockey Women's Division I All-American: First Team

Personal
Jincy Dunne is the daughter of Tom and Tammy Dunne. She has five siblings who each play hockey. Her older sister, Jessica, also played for the Ohio State hockey team. Her brother Josh plays for the Cleveland Monsters in the AHL. Her sister Josey plays for the University of Minnesota, brother James plays for Oklahoma State University, and sister Joy played for the United States women's national U-18 team and has committed to Ohio State as well.

References

1997 births
Living people
American women's ice hockey defensemen
Ice hockey players at the 2022 Winter Olympics
Medalists at the 2022 Winter Olympics
Olympic silver medalists for the United States in ice hockey
Olympic ice hockey players of the United States
Ohio State Buckeyes women's ice hockey players
Professional Women's Hockey Players Association players